John Carroll (born 14 July 1972) is an English cricketer. He played thirty first-class matches for Cambridge University Cricket Club between 1992 and 1995.

See also
 List of Cambridge University Cricket Club players

References

External links
 

1972 births
Living people
English cricketers
Cambridge University cricketers
People from Bebington
Oxfordshire cricketers